The Venezuelan Numbering Plan is an open telephone numbering plan with three-digit area codes and seven-digit telephone numbers that directs telephone calls to particular regions on a public switched telephone network (PSTN) or to a mobile telephone network, where they are further routed by the local network. The last revision of the current numbering plan is September 21, 2000.

Example landline calls (using Caracas as reference):
            5551212  (within metropolitan area)
       0212 5551212  (within Venezuela, Caracas excluded)
 011 58 212 5551212  (from the U.S./Canada to Venezuela)

Geographic area codes

Mobile telephone area codes

Area codes 417 and 418 were deleted in 2006 when Digicel and Infonet were bought by Digitel, migrating their subscribers to a single access code: 412.

Other area codes
Codes starting with 1XX specify a particular carrier to route a call to (XX denotes the carrier code).
Codes starting with 5 are region-free and are treated as local calls wherever the calling party is dialing from (within Venezuela only).
Codes starting with 8 are toll-free numbers.
Codes starting with 9 are assigned to premium rate services.

Notes

External links
Compañía Anónima Nacional de Teléfonos de Venezuela

Venezuela
Telecommunications in Venezuela
Telephone numbers